NTFS volume mount points are specialized NTFS filesystem objects which are used to mount and provide an entry point to other volumes.

Description 
NTFS volume mount points are NTFS filesystem objects—implemented as NTFS reparse points—which are used to mount and provide an entry point to other volumes. Volume mount points are supported from NTFS 3.0, which was introduced with Windows 2000.

Use 
Mount points can be created in a directory on an NTFS file system, which gives a reference to the root directory of the mounted volume. Any empty directory can be converted to a mount point. The mounted volume is not limited to the NTFS filesystem but can be formatted with any file system supported by Microsoft Windows. However, though these are similar to POSIX mount points found in Unix and Unix-like systems, they only support local filesystems; on Windows Vista and later versions of Windows, NTFS symbolic links can be used to link local directories to remote SMB network paths.

Limitations

Symbolic links do not work during early boot, so it's impossible to redirect e.g.:
 \Windows
 \Windows\System32
 \Windows\Config

Nevertheless, it is possible to redirect:
 \Users
 \Documents and Settings
 \Program Files
 \Program Files (x86)

See also 
 NTFS symbolic link
 NTFS junction point
 NTFS reparse point
 Symbolic link

External links
 Volume Mount Points
 Creating Volume Mount Points

Windows disk file systems